Round Top is a mountain in the Central New York region of New York. It is located southeast of East Winfield, New York.

References

Mountains of Otsego County, New York
Mountains of New York (state)
Mountains of Herkimer County, New York